90 Day Men is an American progressive rock band formed in 1995 in St. Louis, Missouri, United States, and later based in Chicago, Illinois. Their name is a slang term used by police officers to refer to prison inmates who are due to undergo psychiatric examination.

History
The group began as an early post-hardcore band, similar to Louisville, Kentucky, groups such as Slint and June of 44. Formed as a trio in 1995 by Brian Case, Cayce Key and Chandler McWilliams, it released its first 7" single in 1996 entitled, "Taking Apart the Vessel".

Robert Lowe joined the group in 1997 on trumpet and vocals but later moved to bass guitar when McWilliams departed. Their first recording with this line-up was the 7" single, "If You Can Bake a Cake, You Can Build a Bomb", in 1997, followed by an EP on Temporary Residence in 1998. In late 1998, they signed with Southern Records, who released their first full-length album, entitled (It (Is) It) Critical Band, in 2000. By this time, the  keyboard player Andy Lansangan had joined the group. Two further LPs followed, To Everybody in 2002 and Panda Park in 2004, which was the subject of significant critical acclaim.

In 2005, Lowe embarked a solo project called Lichens, and released solo material under the name Robert A. A. Lowe.

The guitarist, Brian Case, played in the Chicago garage rock band The Ponys, Disappears and currently in a project called Facs.

, drummer Cayce Key plays in Bloodiest.

Discography
Taking Apart the Vessel EP (self-released, 1996)
If You Can Bake a Cake, You Can Build a Bomb EP (Action Boy, 1997)
1975-1977-1998 EP (Temporary Residence, 1998) This CD contains the "If You Can Bake a Cake, You Can Build a Bomb 7"
Split with GoGoGoAirheart (Box Factory Records, 2000)
(It (Is) It) Critical Band (Southern Records, 2000)
To Everybody (Southern, 2002)
Too Late or Too Dead EP (Southern, 2003)
Panda Park (Southern, 2004)

References

External links
90 Day Men Myspace Page

Musical groups from Chicago
Math rock groups
American post-hardcore musical groups
1995 establishments in Missouri
Temporary Residence Limited artists